Coleophora ochroflava is a moth of the family Coleophoridae. It is found in north-western Russia, Ukraine, Romania, Bulgaria, Greece and Italy.

The larvae feed on the leaves of Atriplex tatarica, Atriplex nitens, Atriplex verrucifera and Halimione partulocoides.

References

ochroflava
Moths described in 1961
Moths of Europe